The Algiers putsch can be one of the three historical military coups d'état that happened in French Algeria's capital -then second to Paris as most populated French city- in different contexts;

World War II (1939–1945)
Algiers putsch of 1942 on November 8, 1942, a Free French resistance uprising against Vichy French administration

Algerian War (1954–1962)
Algiers putsch of 1958 on May 13, 1958, supporting retired General Charles de Gaulle
Algiers putsch of 1961 on April 21, 1961, against Fifth French Republic President Charles de Gaulle